Howard Edmond Campbell (January 4, 1890 – January 6, 1971) was a Republican member of the U.S. House of Representatives from Pennsylvania.

Howard E. Campbell was born in Pittsburgh, Pennsylvania. He attended the public schools and the University of Pittsburgh. He was engaged in the real estate and insurance business in Pittsburgh in 1922, and president of the Pittsburgh Real Estate Board in 1943 and 1944.

Campbell was elected as a Republican to the Seventy-ninth Congress. He was unsuccessful in his bid for renomination to run as the Republican Party candidate for the 80th Congress during the 1946. He was President of East Liberty Chamber of Commerce in 1954 and 1955. He resided in Pittsburgh until his death there in 1971.

Sources 

 The Political Graveyard

1890 births
1971 deaths
Politicians from Pittsburgh
Republican Party members of the United States House of Representatives from Pennsylvania
Burials at Homewood Cemetery